Kurganinsky District is an administrative district (raion), one of the thirty-eight in Krasnodar Krai, Russia. As a municipal division, it is incorporated as Kurganinsky Municipal District. It is located in the east of the krai. Its administrative center is the town of Kurganinsk.

History 
The district was formed on June 2, 1924 as part of South-East, Russian SFSR. Its structure included a part of the territory of the abolished Armavir department of the Kuban-Black Sea region. Since November 16, 1924, the district is part of the North Caucasus Krai. Since January 10, 1934, the district is part of the Azov-Black Sea Krai. The Temirgoevsky District was separated from the Kurganinsky District on December 31, 1934. On September 13, 1937, Kurganinsky district was the part of the Krasnodar Territory.

In 2005, rural administrations were abolished in the district and 10 municipalities were established.

Population 
 The population of Kurganinsk accounts for 46.6% of the district's total population.

See also 
Administrative divisions of Krasnodar Krai

References

Notes

Sources

Districts of Krasnodar Krai